Yaken Hussein Zaki (12 September 1934 – 22 December 2012) was an Egyptian footballer. He competed at the 1960 Summer Olympics and the 1964 Summer Olympics.

References

External links
 
 

1934 births
2012 deaths
Egyptian footballers
Egypt international footballers
Olympic footballers of Egypt
Footballers at the 1960 Summer Olympics
Footballers at the 1964 Summer Olympics
1959 African Cup of Nations players
1970 African Cup of Nations players
People from Aswan
Association football midfielders
Al Ahly SC players
Zamalek SC players